Shenyang Northeastern High School may refer to:
 Zhongshan High School of Northeast
 Northeast Yucai School